BRP Diego Silang (PF-9) was an  of the Philippine Navy in commission from 1976 to 1990. She and her three sister ships were the largest Philippine Navy ships of their time.

History

Construction and United States Navy service 1944-1946

Diego Silang was built in the United States by Lake Washington Shipyard at Houghton, Washington, as the United States Navy Barnegat-class seaplane tender USS Bering Strait (AVP-34). Commissioned in July 1944, Bering Strait served in the Central Pacific during World War II and on occupation duty in Japan postwar. She was decommissioned in June 1946 and placed in reserve.

United States Coast Guard service 1949-1971

The U.S. Navy loaned Bering Strait to the United States Coast Guard, which commissioned her in 1949 as the Casco-class Coast Guard cutter USCGC Bering Strait (WAVP-382). Reclassified as a high endurance cutter and redesignated WHEC-382 in 1966, she patrolled ocean stations in the Pacific Ocean, for nearly 22 years, reporting weather data and engaging in search-and-rescue and law-enforcement operations. During the Vietnam War, she served two tours off Vietnam, in 1967-1968 and in 1970.

Republic of Vietnam Navy service 1971-1975

Bering Strait was transferred to South Vietnam in 1971 and was commissioned into the Republic of Vietnam Navy as the frigate . When South Vietnam collapsed at the end of the Vietnam War in April 1975, Trần Quang Khải fled to Subic Bay in the Philippines, packed with South Vietnamese refugees.

Acquisition by the Philippines
On 22 May 1975 and 23 May 1975, a U.S. Coast Guard team inspected Trần Quang Khải and several other former Casco-class cutters which had been transferred to South Vietnam in 1971 and 1972 and, like Trần Quang Khải, fled to the Philippines in April 1975. One of the inspectors noted: "These vessels brought in several hundred refugees and are generally rat-infested. They are in a filthy, deplorable condition. Below decks generally would compare with a garbage scow." After Trần Quang Khải was cleaned, repaired, and made ready to return to service, the U.S. Navy transferred her to the Republic of the Philippines, with the formal transfer occurring on 5 April 1976.

Philippine Navy service 1977-1990
The ship was acquired by the Philippine government on 5 April 1976, and was commissioned as Philippine Navy frigate RPS Diego Silang (PF-9). In June 1980 she was reclassified and renamed as BRP Diego Silang (PF-9), and served the Philippine Navy until her decommissioning in June 1985. She was again recommissioned afterwards as BRP Diego Silang (PF-14) and was finally decommissioned in April 1990.

Disposal

After finding her beyond economical repair, Diego Silang was discarded in July 1990 and probably scrapped. Some of her usable parts were made available for her sister ship .

Technical details
There were changes made to the Andrés Bonifacio class as compared to their original design during its service with the US Navy, US Coast Guard and the Republic of Vietnam Navy. The ships were passed to the Philippine Navy with fewer weapons on-board and old surface search radars, and these were addressed later on by the Philippine Navy through modernization programs, including the addition of a helicopter landing pad in 1979.

The single Mk.12 5"/38 caliber gun (127 mm) was Diego Silangs primary weapon. It was mounted in a Mark 30 Mod 0 enclosed base ring and had a range of up to  yards; the gun was a dual-purpose weapon, capable of anti-surface and anti-air warfare. She also carried two twin Mk.1 Bofors 40mm anti-aircraft gun mounts, four Mk. 4 single 20-millimeterOerlikon anti-aircraft gun mounts, four M2 Browning .50-caliber (12.7-millimeter) general purpose machine guns, and two 81mm mortars.

A helicopter deck was added aft in 1979 by Hatch and Kirk, Inc. It could accommodate a MBB Bo 105C helicopter used by the Philippine Navy for utility, scout, and maritime patrol purposes, although the ship had no capability to refuel or otherwise support visiting helicopters.

Radar system installed include the Sperry SPS-53 Surface Search & Navigation Radar replacing the previously installed AN/SPS-23, while retaining both the AN/SPS-29D Air Search Radar and Mk.26 Mod.1 Fire Control Radar System.

Diego Silang was powered by two Fairbanks-Morse 38D diesel engines with a combined power of around 6,200 brake horsepower (4.63 megawatts) driving two propellers.

The Philippine Navy made plans to equip Diego Silang and her sister ships with new radar systems and long-range BGM-84 Harpoon anti-ship cruise missiles, but this upgrade did not materialize due to the worsening political and economic crisis in the Philippines in the mid-1980s.

References

External links
 Philippine Navy Official website
 Philippine Fleet Official Website
 Philippine Defense Forum
 NavSource Online: Service Ship Photo Archive: USCGC Bering Strait (WHEC-383) ex USCGC Bering Strait (WAVP-383) (1948 - 1966) USS Bering Strait (AVP-43 (1944 - 1948)
 Hazegray World Navies Today: Philippines
 Naming and Code Designation of PN Ships
 United States Coast Guard Historians Office: Bering Strait, 1948 WAVP / WHEC-382 Radio Call Sign: NBYG
 U.S. Coast Guard Historians Office: McCulloch, 1946 WAVP / WHEC-386
 
 Department of the Navy: Naval Historical Center: Online Library of Selected Images: U.S. Navy Ships: USS Bering Strait (AVP-34), 1944-1948
 Gray, Randal, Ed. Conways All the Worlds Fighting Ships 1947-1982 Part II: The Warsaw Pact and Non-Aligned Nations. Annapolis, Maryland: Naval Institute Press, 1983. .
 Moore, John, Captain, RN, Ed. Janes Fighting Ships 1980-1981. New York: Janes Publishing, Inc., 1980. .

Andrés Bonifacio-class frigates